Ansager is a town in southwestern Jutland in the Varde Municipality, in Region of Southern Denmark. As of 1 January 2022, it has a population of 1,277.

References 

Cities and towns in the Region of Southern Denmark
Varde Municipality